The Archaeological Collection of Agios Andreas on Sifnos is a small local museum at the Archaeological site of Agios Andreas. In a modern building the Museum exhibits local findings, from the  Mycenaean era until the 5th century BC. The museum was opened in 2010. Until that time was part of the local findings exposed in the Archaeological Museum of Sifnos, in the village of Kastro.

External links

 Sifnos Ancient Site of Agios Andreas in www.greeka.com

 Sifnos
Sifnos